Carlos Cañas (September 3, 1924 -  April 14, 2013) was a Salvadoran painter who studied art and theory at the School of Arts of El Salvador. In 1950, he received a scholarship to study art, history, aesthetics, and literature in Madrid at the Real Academia de Bellas Artes de San Fernando.

Cañas participated at the First Latin American Biennial, Spain (1951); in the Fourth Biennial of the Engraving, Japan (1964); in the Sutton Gallery, EUA (1979), amongst other important exhibitions at the worldwide level.

In 2012, he received national prize of culture, Premio Nacional de Cultura of El Salvador.

References

20th-century Salvadoran painters
Male painters
21st-century painters
1924 births
2013 deaths
People from San Salvador